Jerome Bossr (born 22 September 1998) is a South African cricketer. He made his List A debut on 20 October 2019, for Border in the 2019–20 CSA Provincial One-Day Challenge. He made his first-class debut on 21 November 2019, for Border in the 2019–20 CSA 3-Day Provincial Cup. He made his Twenty20 debut on 5 October 2021, for Border in the 2021–22 CSA Provincial T20 Knock-Out tournament.

References

External links
 

1998 births
Living people
South African cricketers
Border cricketers
Place of birth missing (living people)
20th-century South African people